Despot may refer to:

 Despot (court title), a Byzantine court title
 Despotism, a form of government in which power is concentrated in the hands of one individual
 Despot (rapper), rapper Alec Reinstein's stage name
 , a TV series
 Despot (vehicle), armoured multifunctional vehicle

People with the given name
 Despot Badžović (1850–1930), teacher, activist of the Serbian national movement

People with the surname
 Blaženka Despot (1930–2001), Croatian philosopher and sociologist
 Branko Despot (1942–), Croatian philosopher
 Dragan Despot (1956–), Croatian actor
 Iacob Heraclid Despot (1527–1563), Prince of Moldavia
 Ilija Despot (1885–1970), Croatian poet and writer
 Veljko Despot (born 1948), Croatian record producer